The 1911 Indiana Hoosiers football team was an American football team that represented Indiana University Bloomington during the 1911 college football season. In their seventh season under head coach James M. Sheldon, the Hoosiers compiled a 3–3–1 record, finished in last place in the Western Conference, but still outscored all opponents by a combined total of 74 to 46.

Schedule

References

Indiana
Indiana Hoosiers football seasons
Indiana Hoosiers football